2010 in Bellator MMA was the second installment of the Bellator Fighting Championships (Bellator FC)-produced series. It started on April 8, 2010 and ended June 24, 2010. Tournaments were held in the featherweight, lightweight, welterweight and middleweight divisions. The winner of each tournament will get a shot at the current Bellator Champion in his respective weight class. Three of the four current Bellator Champions also fought during this season in "Super Fights". These non-tournament, non-title catch-weight fights were to help prepare the champions in defending their titles against the winners of this season's tournament winners sometime in the third season.

Bellator 13

Bellator 13 was a mixed martial arts event by Bellator Fighting Championships. The event took place on Thursday, April 8, 2010 at the Seminole Hard Rock Hotel & Casino in Hollywood, Florida.

Background

The card featured two quarter-final bouts of the Featherweight and Lightweight tournaments Bellator is holding in its second season. The event was distributed live in prime time by FOX Sports Net and its regional sports network affiliates.

Janne Tulirinta was originally set to fight Carey Vanier, however, Tulirinta was forced out of the bout because of visa issues. Joe Duarte was his replacement.

Results

Bellator 14

Bellator 14 was a mixed martial arts event by Bellator Fighting Championships. The event took place on Thursday, April 15, 2010 at the Chicago Theatre in Chicago, Illinois.

Background

The card featured the quarter-final bouts in three of the four tournaments Bellator is holding in its second season. The event was distributed live in prime time by FOX Sports Net and its regional sports network affiliates.

Originally, Imada was set to fight Ferrid Kheder at Bellator 15 but an injury forced Kheder out of the bout. James Krause was tapped as Kheder's replacement and the bout was moved to this event. To make room, a featherweight tournament bout between Patricio Freire and William Romero was moved to Bellator 15.

A bout between Jonatas Novaes and Daniel Mason-Straus was canceled due to an undisclosed illness.

Results

Bellator 15

Bellator 15 was a mixed martial arts event held by Bellator Fighting Championships. The event took take place on Thursday, April 22, 2010 in Uncasville, Connecticut. The event was distributed live in prime time by FOX Sports Net and its regional sports network affiliates.

Background

The card featured quarter-final bouts in the Welterweight and Featherweight tournaments Bellator is holding in its second season.

Dan Hornbuckle was originally set to fight Sean Pierson, but a back injury forced Pierson out of the bout. Tyler Stinson was his replacement.

Jim Wallhead was forced out of his bout with Jacob McClintock due to air travel not being available in England. Ryan Thomas was Wallhead's replacement.

Results

Bellator 16

Bellator 16 was a mixed martial arts event by Bellator Fighting Championships. The event took place on Thursday, April 29, 2010 in Kansas City, Missouri. The event was distributed live in prime time by FOX Sports Net and its regional sports network affiliates.

Background

The card featured the quarter-final bouts of the Middleweight Tournament Bellator is holding in its second season.

Eric Schambari was originally set to fight Matt Major, but Major instead fought Alexander Shlemenko and Schambari fought Luke Zachrich.

Rudy Bears was first set to fight Zak Cummings, however due to undisclosed reasons, Cummings pulled out of the fight and was replaced by Brent Weedman.

Results

Bellator 17

Bellator 17 was a mixed martial arts event by Bellator Fighting Championships. The event took place on Thursday, May 6, 2010 at the Citi Performing Arts Center: Wang Theatre in Boston, Massachusetts. The event was distributed live in prime time by FOX Sports Net and its regional sports network affiliates.

Results

Bellator 18

Bellator 18 was a mixed martial arts event by Bellator Fighting Championships. The event took place on Thursday, May 13, 2010 in Monroe, Louisiana. The event was distributed live in prime time by FOX Sports Net and its regional sports network affiliates.

Background

This event featured two semi-final match ups from Bellator's season two tournament as well as four additional preliminary card fights featuring local fighters.

Hector Lombard was scheduled to face former WEC Middleweight champion Paulo Filho in a non-title bout, but Filho pulled out of the bout and was replaced by Jay Silva. This marks the fourth bout Filho has pulled out of in two years.

Results

Bellator 19

Bellator 19 was a mixed martial arts event by Bellator Fighting Championships. The event took place on Thursday, May 20, 2010 at Verizon Theater in Grand Prairie, Texas. The event was distributed live in prime time by FOX Sports Net and its regional sports network affiliates.

Results

Bellator 20

Bellator 20 was a mixed martial arts event by Bellator Fighting Championships. The event took place on Thursday, May 27, 2010 at the Majestic Theatre in San Antonio, Texas. The event was distributed live in prime time by FOX Sports Net and its regional sports network affiliates.

Background

The bout between Eddie Sanchez and Wayne Cole was reported to be for a spot in Bellator's season three Heavyweight tournament. However, Cole pulled out of the fight and was replaced by Marcus Suers.

Two of the match ups became catchweight bouts after Brian Melancon and Andrew Chappelle failed to make weight.

Results

Bellator 21

Bellator 21 was a mixed martial arts event held by Bellator Fighting Championships. The event took place on Thursday, June 10, 2010 at Seminole Hard Rock Hotel & Casino in Hollywood, Florida. The event was distributed live in prime time by FOX Sports Net and its regional sports network affiliates.

Background

The card featured the final tournament fight in the Lightweight division. The winner was crowned the Bellator season 2 Lightweight winner and would face the current Bellator Lightweight Champion Eddie Alvarez sometime during season 3.

Results

Bellator 22

Bellator 22 was a mixed martial arts event held by Bellator Fighting Championships. The event took place on Thursday, June 17, 2010 at Kansas City Power & Light District in Kansas City, Missouri. The event was distributed live in prime time by FOX Sports Net and its regional sports network affiliates.

Background

The card featured the final tournament fight in the Welterweight division. The winner was crowned the Bellator season 2 Welterweight winner and would face the current Bellator Welterweight Champion Lyman Good sometime during season three.

Results

Bellator 23

Bellator 23 was a mixed martial arts event held by Bellator Fighting Championships. The event took place on Thursday, June 24, 2010 at Fourth Street Live! in Louisville, Kentucky. The event was distributed live in primetime by FOX Sports Net and its regional sports network affiliates.

Background

The card featured the final tournament fight in the Featherweight and Middleweight divisions. The winners were crowned the Bellator Season 2 Featherweight and Middleweight winners and would face the current Bellator Featherweight and Middleweight Champions, Joe Soto and Hector Lombard, respectively, sometime during season 3.

Luke Zachrich was originally set to compete in a middleweight bout against Mike Fleniken. However, Zachrich was forced to pull out of the fight for an undisclosed reason. He was replaced by UFC veteran, Johnny Rees. However, Rees was then replaced by Stoney Hale.

Kurt Kinser agreed to catchweight contest after Dave Overfield weighed-in well-over the 155-pound lightweight limit.

Results

Tournaments

Middleweight Tournament Bracket

Welterweight Tournament Bracket

Lightweight Tournament Bracket

Featherweight Tournament Bracket

Bellator 24

Bellator 24 was a mixed martial arts event held by Bellator Fighting Championships. The event took place on Thursday, August 12, 2010 at the Seminole Hard Rock Hotel & Casino in Hollywood, Florida. The card began Bellator Season Three and featured the first round of the Bellator 115-pound women's tournament and an opening round fight in the Heavyweight tournament.

Background

Two bouts, Nico Parella vs. Efrain Ruiz and Frank Carrillo vs. Moyses Gabin, were scratched from the untelevised portion of this card. Parella pulled his groin and Gabin suffered a broken foot, which forced both off the card.

Results

Main Card
Middleweight bout:  Hector Lombard vs.  Herbert Goodman
Lombard defeated Goodman via KO (punches) at 0:38 of round 1.
Heavyweight Quarterfinal:  Eddie Sanchez vs.  Neil Grove
Grove def. Sanchez via TKO (doctor stoppage) at 1:32 of round 1.
Women's (115 lb) Quarterfinal:  Megumi Fujii vs.  Carla Esparza
Fujii defeated Esparza via submission (armbar) at 0:57 of round 2.
Women's (115 lb) Quarterfinal:  Jessica Aguilar vs.  Lynn Alvarez
Aguilar defeated Alvarez via submission (arm triangle choke) at 4:01 of round 1.

Local Feature Fights
Lightweight bout:  Yves Edwards vs.  Luis Palomino
Edwards defeated Palomino via unanimous decision (29–28, 29–28, 29–28).
Featherweight bout:  Eric Luke vs.  Farkhad Sharipov
Sharipov defeated Luke via unanimous decision (30–27, 30–27, 30–27).
Bantamweight bout:  Tulio Quintanilla vs.  Brian Eckstein
Quintanilla defeated Eckstein via KO (punches) at 2:48 of round 3.

Bellator 25

Bellator 25 was a mixed martial arts event held by Bellator Fighting Championships. This event took place on August 19, 2010 at the Chicago Theatre in Chicago, Illinois.  The card featured tournament fights in Bellator's third season.  The event was distributed live in prime time by FOX Sports Net and its regional sports network affiliates. In Japan, the event was distributed with a short delay by Cavea.

Background

A lightweight bout featuring Mark Miller and Josh Shockley was set to happen at this event. But the week before the event, the bout was scratched when Miller suffered a rib injury in training.

Results

Main Card
Welterweight bout:  Brad Blackburn vs.  Dan Hornbuckle
Hornbuckle defeated Blackburn via unanimous decision (29–28, 29–28, 29–28) to earn a spot in Bellator's Season Four Welterweight Tournament.
Heavyweight Quarterfinal:  Cole Konrad vs.  Rogent Lloret
Konrad defeated Lloret via unanimous decision (30–27, 30–27, 30–27).
Heavyweight Quarterfinal:  Damian Grabowski vs.  Scott Barrett
Grabowski defeated Barrett via unanimous decision (30–27, 30–27, 30–27).
Women's (115 lb) Quarterfinal:  Jessica Penne vs.  Zoila Gurgel
Gurgel defeated Pene via unanimous decision (30–27, 30–27, 30–27).

Local Feature Fights
Catchweight (177 lbs) bout:  Shonie Carter vs.  Torrance Taylor
Taylor defeated Carter via unanimous decision (30–26, 30–27, 30–27).
Welterweight bout:  Brian Gassaway vs.  Kevin Knabjian
Gassaway defeated Knabjian via unanimous decision (29–28, 29–28, 29–28).
Welterweight bout:  John Kolosci vs.  Kenny Robertson
Robertson defeated Kolosci via submission (americana) at 2:41 of round 2.
Lightweight bout:  Keoki Cypriano vs.  Eric Kriegermeier
Kriegermeier defeated Cypriano via submission (triangle choke) at 3:16 of round 1.

Bellator 26

Bellator 26 was a mixed martial arts event held by Bellator Fighting Championships. The event took place on Thursday, August 26, 2010 at Kansas City Power & Light District in Kansas City, Missouri.   The card featured tournament fights in Bellator's third season.  The event was distributed live in prime time by FOX Sports Net and its regional sports network affiliates.

Background

Rory Markham was scheduled to fight Steve Carl, however Markham was not medically cleared. Tyler Stinson took his place.

Results

Main Card
Catchweight (175 lb) bout:  Tyler Stinson vs.  Steve Carl
Carl defeated Stinson via technical submission (guillotine choke) at 2:30 of round 1 to earn a spot in Bellator's Season Four Welterweight Tournament.
Heavyweight Quarterfinal:  Mike Hayes vs.  Alexey Oleinik
Oleinik defeated Hayes via split decision (28–29, 29–28, 29–28).
Bantamweight Quarterfinal:  Jose Vega vs.  Danny Tims
Vega defeated Tims via unanimous decision (29–28, 30–27, 29–28).
Women's (115 lb) Quarterfinal:   Aisling Daly vs.  Lisa Ward
Ward defeated Daly via unanimous decision (30–27, 30–27, 30–27).

Local Feature Fights
Middleweight bout:  Zak Cummings vs.  Rudy Bears
Cummings defeated Bears via submission (D'arce choke) at 1:27 of round 1.
Featherweight bout:  Brian Davidson vs.  Kevin Croom
Croom defeated Davidson via submission (rear-naked choke) at 3:22 of round 2.
Middleweight bout:  Brian Imes vs.  John Ott
Ott defeated Imes via unanimous decision  (30–27, 30–27, 30–27).
Light Heavyweight bout:  Demetrius Richards vs.  Jeb Chiles
Chiles defeated Richards via technical submission (kimura) at 3:51 of round 2.

Bellator 27

Bellator 27 was a mixed martial arts event held by Bellator Fighting Championships. The event took place on Thursday, September 2, 2010 at Majestic Theatre in San Antonio, Texas.  The card featured tournament fights in Bellator's third season.  The event was distributed live in prime time by FOX Sports Net and its regional sports network affiliates.

Results

Main Card
Featherweight Championship bout:  Joe Soto (c) vs.  Joe Warren
Warren defeated Soto via TKO (knee & punches) at 0:33 of round 2 to become the new Bellator Featherweight Champion.
Bantamweight Quarterfinal:  Travis Reddinger vs.  Ulysses Gomez
Gomez defeated Reddinger via split decision (28–29, 29–28, 29–28).
Bantamweight Quarterfinal:  Zach Makovsky vs.  Nick Mamalis
Makovsky defeated Mamalis via unanimous decision (30–27, 30–27, 30–27)
Bantamweight Quarterfinal:  Ed West vs.  Bryan Goldsby
West defeated Goldsby via unanimous decision (30–27, 29–28, 29–28)

Local Feature Fights
Middleweight bout:  Andrew Craig vs.  Rodrigo Pinheiro
Craig defeated Pinheiro via TKO (doctor stoppage) at 2:53 of round 3.
Lightweight bout:  Aaron Barringer vs. Gilbert Jimenez
Jimenez defeated Barringer via unanimous decision.
Heavyweight bout:  Dale Mitchell vs.  Richard Odoms
Odoms defeated Mitchell via split decision.
Welterweight bout:  Joe Christopher vs.  Andrew Chappelle
Chappelle defeated Christopher via unanimous decision.
Light Heavyweight bout:  Jon Kirk vs.  Shane Faulkner
Kirk defeated Faulkner via TKO (punches) at 2:19 of round 3.
Featherweight bout:  Steven Peterson vs.  Ernest De La Cruz
Peterson defeated De La Cruz via unanimous decision (30–27, 30–27, 29–28).

Bellator 28

Bellator 28 was a mixed martial arts event held by Bellator Fighting Championships. The event took place on Thursday, September 9, 2010 at Mahalia Jackson Theater in New Orleans, Louisiana. The event was distributed live in prime time by FOX Sports Net and its regional sports network affiliates. This was the first Bellator card with no Tournament Bouts.

Background

Chas Skelly was expected to fight Georgi Karakhanyan in a fourth season featherweight tournament qualifier bout. However, Skelly injured himself during training and was forced to pull out of the bout. Skelly's replacement was to be UFC veteran, Alvin Robinson. However, Robinson was also forced to pull out of the bout due to injury.  Robinson was replaced by WEC veteran Anthony Leone.

Toney Canales and J.C. Pennington were set to fight, but for unknown reasons, the fight was pulled at the last minute.

The card took place in the same city and during the same night and time as the 2010 NFL season opener, a rematch of the NFC Championship game between the New Orleans Saints and the Minnesota Vikings, a decision in MMA to counter-program a marquee NFL event which may have had adverse effect on local ticket sales.

Results

Main Card
Lightweight bout:  Eric Larkin vs.  Marcus Andrusia
Larkin defeated Andrusia via submission (guillotine choke) at 2:46 of round 1.
Lightweight bout:  Rich Clementi vs.  Carey Vanier
Vanier defeated Clementi via split decision (29–28, 28–29, 29–28) to earn a spot in Bellator's Season Four Lightweight Tournament.
Middleweight bout:  Matt Horwich vs.  Eric Schambari
Schambari defeated Horwich via split decision (30–27, 28–29, 30–27).
Featherweight bout:  Georgi Karakhanyan vs.  Anthony Leone
Karakhanyan defeated Leone via unanimous decision (29–28, 30–27, 30–27) to earn a spot in Bellator's Season Four Featherweight Tournament.

Local Feature Fights
Heavyweight bout:  Tony Roberts vs.  Kelvin Doss
Roberts defeated Doss via submission (punches) in round 1.
Bantamweight bout:  Jonathan Mackles vs.  Brock Kerry
Mackles defeated Kerry via split decision (30–27, 28–29, 29–28).
Welterweight bout:  Josh Rafferty vs.  Charlie Rader
Rader defaetd Rafferty via TKO (punches) at 1:14 of round 1.
Lightweight bout:  Scott O'Shaughnessy vs.  Gabe Woods
O'Shaughnessy defeated Woods via submission (armbar) at 2:11 of round 3.

Bellator 29

Bellator 29 was a mixed martial arts event held by Bellator Fighting Championships. The event took place on Thursday, September 16, 2010 at The Rave in Milwaukee, Wisconsin.  The card featured tournament fights in Bellator's third season. The event was distributed live in prime time by FOX Sports Net and its regional sports network affiliates.

Background

Bellator 29 was the first sanctioned MMA event in Wisconsin.

Chico Camus was set to compete against Jameel Massouh in a catchweight bout. However, Camus injured his sternum in a car accident and was forced to withdraw from the bout. Kyle Dietz was set to be Camus' replacement; however, an illness forced Ulysses Gomez out of his bout in the bantamweight tournament and Bryan Goldsby, who was set to fight Nik Mamalis, stepped in for Gomez and returned to the tournament. Dietz was dropped from the card, and Mamalis stepped in to fight Massoush.

Justin Lemke was originally set to fight David Oliva, but Oliva was forced out of the bout due to weight issues. Jason Guida stepped in for Oliva as his replacement.

The Massouh/Mamalis bout was originally contracted as a 140 lb catchweight fight. Massouh initially weighed in two pounds over the limit, but successfully made weight two hours after the original weigh-in on a subsequent attempt. Jason Guida weighed in five pounds over the 210 lb catchweight limit in his bout against Justin Lemke.

Results

Main Card
Catchweight (140 lb) bout:  Jameel Massouh vs.  Nick Mamalis
Massouh defeated Mamalis via submission (guillotine choke) at 4:27 in round 1.
Heavyweight Semifinal:  Damian Grabowski vs.  Cole Konrad
Konrad defeated Grabowski via unanimous decision (30–26, 30–27, 30–27).
Heavyweight Semifinal:   Neil Grove vs.  Alexey Oleinik
Grove defeated Oleinik via TKO (punches) at 0:45 of round 1.
Middleweight bout:  Matt Major vs.  Brett Cooper
Cooper defeated Major via TKO (punches) at 1:27 of round 2.

Local Feature Fights
Catchweight (215 lb) bout:  Justin Lemke vs.  Jason Guida
Lemke defeated Guida via split decision (29–28, 28–29, 29–28).
Lightweight bout:  Nick Dupees vs.  Sasa Perkic
Perkic defeated Dupees via unanimous decision (30–27, 30 -27, 29–28).
Middleweight bout:  Luis Ramirez vs.  Kyle Weickhardt
Weickhardt defeated Ramirez via KO (head kick) at 0:30 of round 1.

Bellator 30

Bellator 30 was a mixed martial arts event held by Bellator Fighting Championships. The event took place on Thursday, September 23, 2010, at Fourth Street Live! in Louisville, Kentucky. The card featured tournament fights in Bellator's third season.  The event was distributed live in prime time by FOX Sports Net and its regional sports network affiliates.

Background
Bryan Goldsby replaced Ulysses Gomez in the bantamweight tournament after Gomez was forced to withdraw due to staph infection.

Results

Main Card
Welterweight bout:  Jacob McClintock vs.  Brent Weedman
Weedman defeated McClintock via TKO (punches) at 3:05 of round 1 to earn a spot in Bellator's Season Four Welterweight Tournament.
Middleweight bout:  Jeremy Horn vs.  Bryan Baker
Baker defeated Horn via unanimous decision (30–27, 29–28, 29–28).
Bantamweight Semifinal bout:  Bryan Goldsby vs. Zach Makovsky
Makovsky defeated Goldsby via unanimous decision (30–27, 29–28, 29–28).
Bantamweight Semifinal bout:  Jose Vega vs.  Ed West
West defeated Vega via split decision (29–28, 28–29, 29–28).

Local Feature Fights
Middleweight bout:  John Troyer vs.  Josh Clark
Troyer defeated Clark via unanimous decision (30–27, 30–27, 30–27).
Heavyweight bout:  Ron Sparks vs.  Greg Maynard
Sparks defeated Maynard via KO (punch) at 0:50 of round 1.
Featherweight bout:  T.J. Barber vs.  B.J. Ferguson
Ferguson defeated Barber via submission (armbar) in round 2.
Middleweight bout:  Mike Fleniken vs.  Jeremiah Riggs
Riggs defeated Fleniken via unanimous decision (29–28, 29–28, 29–28).
Welterweight bout:  Stoney Hale vs.  Mike O'Donnell
O'Donnell defeated Hale via submission (kimura) at 0:50 of round 2.

Bellator 31

Bellator 31 was a mixed martial arts event held by Bellator Fighting Championships. The event took place on Thursday, September 30, 2010 at L'Auberge du Lac Resort in Lake Charles, Louisiana. The card featured tournament fights in Bellator's third season. The event was distributed live in prime time by FOX Sports Net and its regional sports network affiliates.

Background

A previously announced fight between Ricco Rodriguez and Dave Herman, was scrapped from this card due to Rodriguez suffering a knee injury. Michal Kita served as Rodriguez's replacement.

Results

Main Card
Women's (115 lb) Semifinal bout:  Jessica Aguilar vs.  Zoila Gurgel
Gurgel defeated Aguilar via split decision (30–27, 27–30, 30–27).
Women's (115 lb) Semifinal bout:  Megumi Fujii vs.  Lisa Ward
Fujii defeated Ward via submission (armbar) at 1:39 of round 1
Welterweight bout:  Yoshiyuki Yoshida vs.  Chris Lozano
Lozano defeated Yoshida via TKO (Corner Stoppage) at 5:00 of Round 2 to earn a spot in Bellator's Season Four Welterweight Tournament.

Local Feature Fights
Heavyweight bout:  Mark Holata vs.  Shawn Jordan
Holata defeated Jordan via KO (punch) at 1:13 of round 1.
Lightweight bout:  John Harris vs.  Kyle Miers
Harris defeated Miers via submission (Rear Naked Choke) at 0:49 of round 2.
Middleweight bout:  Tim Ruberg vs.  Aaron Davis
Ruberg defeated Davis via submission (Rear Naked Choke) at 1:44 of round 2.
Heavyweight bout:  Dave Herman vs.  Michał Kita
Herman defeated Kita via submission (Omoplata) at 3:16 of round 1.
Catchweight (165 lb) bout:  Scott Stapp vs.  Michael Chandler
Chandler defeated Stapp via TKO (Punches) at 1:57 of round 1.

Bellator 32

Bellator 32 was a mixed martial arts event held by Bellator Fighting Championships. The event took place on Thursday, October 14, 2010 at Kansas City Power & Light District in Kansas City, Missouri. The card featured the tournament finals fights in Bellator's third season.  The event was distributed live in prime time by FOX Sports Net and its regional sports network affiliates.

Background

This was the fourth Bellator event to be held at the Kansas City Power & Light District, all in 2010. Bellator XVI, Bellator XXII and Bellator XXVI have also been held at this venue.

The event hosted bouts to crown the first Bellator Heavyweight and Bantamweight Champions.

Results

Main Card
Heavyweight Tournament Final:  Cole Konrad vs.  Neil Grove
Konrad defeated Grove via submission (americana) at 4:45 of round 1 to become the first Bellator Heavyweight Champion.
Bantamweight Tournament Final:  Zach Makovsky vs.  Ed West
Makovsky defeated West by unanimous decision (50–45, 50–45, 49–46) to become the first Bellator Bantamweight Champion.
Welterweight bout:  Ryan Thomas vs.  Jim Wallhead
Wallhead defeated Thomas by unanimous decision (29–28, 29–28, 29–28) to earn a spot in Bellator's Season Four Welterweight Tournament.
Welterweight bout:  Chris Page vs.  Michael Chandler
Chandler defeated Page via submission (guillotine choke) at 0:57 of round 1.

Local Feature Fights
Featherweight bout:  Ryan Roberts vs.  Eric Marriott
Marriott defeated Roberts via unanimous decision (29–28, 29–28, 30–27).
Catchweight (180 lbs) bout:  Chad Reiner vs.  Rudy Bears
Bears defeated Reiner via KO (Punches) at 1:29 of round 1.
Bantamweight bout:  Jared Downing vs.  Danny Tims
Downing defeated Tims via split decision (30–27, 28–29, 30–27).
Featherweight bout:  Shane Hutchinson vs.  Brian Davidson
Davidson defeated Hutchison via KO (punches) at 0:54 of round 1.

Bellator 33

Bellator 33 was a mixed martial arts event held by Bellator Fighting Championships. The event took place on Thursday, October 21, 2010 at Liacouras Center in Philadelphia, Pennsylvania. The card featured a tournament final fight in Bellator's third season.  The event was distributed live in prime time by FOX Sports Net and its regional sports network affiliates.

Background

The main event was supposed to feature Eddie Alvarez defending his lightweight title against season two's lightweight tournament winner, Pat Curran. Curran injured himself during training so Alvarez instead fought Roger Huerta in a non-title fight.

Wilson Reis vs. Deividas Taurosevičius was set to air as a part of the night's main card; however, the fight was not aired for unknown reasons.

Results

Main Card
Lightweight bout:  Eddie Alvarez vs.  Roger Huerta
Alvarez defeated Huerta via TKO (doctor stoppage) at 5:00 of round 2.
Welterweight Championship bout:  Lyman Good (c) vs.  Ben Askren
Askren defeated Good via unanimous decision (49–46, 48–47, 50–45) to become the new Bellator Welterweight Champion.
Welterweight bout:  Rick Hawn vs.  LeVon Maynard
Hawn defeated Maynard via KO (punches) at 4:53 of round 1 to earn a spot in Bellator's Season Four Welterweight Tournament.

Local Feature Fights
Featherweight bout:  Wilson Reis vs.  Deividas Taurosevičius
Reis defeated Taurosevičius via split decision (29–28, 28–29, 29–28).
Light Heavyweight bout:  Jamal Patterson vs.  Tim Carpenter
Carpenter defeated Patterson via split decision (29–28, 28–29, 29–28).
Catchweight (159 lbs) bout:  Luiz Azeredo vs.  Edward Guedes
Azeredo defeated Guedes via unanimous decision (30–27, 30–27, 30–27).
Featherweight bout:  Kenny Foster vs.  Lester Caslow
Foster defeated Caslow via unanimous decision (29–28, 29–28, 29–28).
Catchweight (130 lb) bout:  Tuan Pham vs.  Nick Cottone
Cottone defeated Pham via unanimous decision (29–28, 29–28, 29–28).
Bantamweight bout:  Lewis Cassner vs.  Francis Evans
Evans defeated Cassner via Submission (Triangle) at 3:20 of round 1.

Bellator 34

Bellator 34 was a mixed martial arts event held by Bellator Fighting Championships. The event took place on Thursday, October 28, 2010 at Seminole Hard Rock Hotel & Casino in Hollywood, Florida. The card featured the final round of the Bellator 115-pound women's tournament in Bellator's third season, as well as Hector Lombard defending his middleweight title. The event was distributed live in prime time by FOX Sports Net and its regional sports network affiliates.

Results

Main Card
Middleweight Championship bout:  Hector Lombard (c) vs.  Alexander Shlemenko
Lombard defeats Shlemenko by unanimous decision (49–46, 49–46, 49–46).
Women's (115 lb) Tournament Final:  Megumi Fujii vs.  Zoila Gurgel
Gurgel defeated Fujii via split decision (48–47, 47–48, 49–46) to become the Bellator Women's Champion.
Middleweight bout:  Mike Bernhard vs.  Dragan Tešanović
Bernhard defeated Tešanović via unanimous decision (30–27, 29–28, 29–28).
Light Heavyweight bout:  Raphael Davis vs.  Tony Lopez
Davis defeated Lopez via unanimous decision (30–27, 30–27, 30–27).

Local Feature Fights
Welterweight bout:  William Kuhn vs.  John Kelly
Kelly defeated Kuhn via unanimous decision (29–28, 29–28, 29–28).
Bantamweight bout:  Ralph Acosta vs.  Tulio Quintanilla
Acosta defeated Quintanila via split decision (29–28, 28–29, 29–28).
Middleweight bout:  Frank Carrillo vs.  Moyses Gabin
Carrillo defeated Gabin via unanimous decision (30–27, 30–27, 30–27).
Middleweight bout:  Igor Almeida vs.  Dan Cramer
Cramer defeated Almeida via TKO (cut) at 2:36 of round 1.
Catchweight (160 lb) bout:  Bounmy Somchay vs.  J. P. Reese
Reese defeated Somchay via TKO (strikes) at 3:32 of round 1.

Tournaments

Heavyweight Tournament Bracket

Bantamweight Tournament Bracket

Women's Flyweight Tournament Bracket

References

External links
Bellator

2010 American television seasons
2010 in mixed martial arts
Bellator MMA events
Fox Sports Networks original programming